The Roman Catholic Diocese of Sakania–Kipushi is a diocese located in the city of Sakania–Kipushi  in the Ecclesiastical province of Lubumbashi in the Democratic Republic of the Congo.

History
 May 12, 1925: Established as Apostolic Prefecture of Upper Luapula from the Apostolic Prefecture of Katanga
 November 14, 1939: Promoted as Apostolic Vicariate of Sakania
 November 10, 1959: Promoted as Diocese of Sakania
 March 5, 1977: Renamed as Diocese of Sakania – Kipushi

Leadership, in reverse chronological order
 Bishops of Sakania–Kipushi (Latin rite), below
 Bishop Gaston Kashala Ruwezi, S.D.B. (since 2004.04.07)
 Bishop Elie Amsini Kiswaya (1977.03.05 – 2001.12.21); see below
 Bishops of Sakania (Latin rite), below
 Bishop Elie Amsini Kiswaya (1975.11.20 – 1977.03.05); see above
 Bishop Petrus Frans Lehaen, S.D.B. (1959.11.10 – 1973.06.15); see below
 Vicars Apostolic of Sakania (Latin rite)
 Bishop Petrus Frans Lehaen, S.D.B. (1959.02.12 – 1959.11.10); see above
 Bishop René van Heusden, S.D.B. (1947.02.13 – 1958.03.22)
 Bishop Jose Sak, S.D.B. (1939.11.14 – 1946.03.15); see below
 Prefect Apostolic of Upper Luapula (Latin rite)
 Father Jose Sak, S.D.B. (1925.07.14 – 1939.11.14); see above

See also
Roman Catholicism in the Democratic Republic of the Congo

Sources
 GCatholic.org
 Catholic Hierarchy

Roman Catholic dioceses in the Democratic Republic of the Congo
Christian organizations established in 1925
Roman Catholic dioceses and prelatures established in the 20th century
Roman Catholic Ecclesiastical Province of Lubumbashi